Isocrinidae is one of four extant families of crinoids in the order Isocrinida.

Genera
Hypalocrinus A.H.Clark, 1908 (1 sp.)
Neocrinus Thomson, 1864 (2 spp.)
†?Archaeoisocrinus Webster and Jell 1999
†Balanocrinus Agassiz 1847 
†Chariocrinus Hess 1972 
Metacrinus Carpenter 1882 
†subfamily Isocrininae Gislen 1924 
†Bakonycrinus Stiller 2011 
†Chladocrinus Agassiz 1836 
†Isocrinus von Meyer in Agassiz, 1836 
†Tyrolecrinus

References

 
Isocrinida
Echinoderm families
Extant Triassic first appearances